Cephalochetus is a genus of rove beetles in the subfamily Paederinae. Species are found in East Asia.

References

External links 
 

 
 Cephalochetus at insectoid.info

Staphylinidae genera
Paederinae